The 2022 National Collegiate Athletic Association (NCAA) Division II football rankings consists primarily of The AFCA Coaches' Poll, determined by coaches part of NCAA Division II football programs. The following weekly polls determine the top 25 teams at the NCAA Division II level of college football for the 2022 season.

Legend

American Football Coaches Association (AFCA) poll

References

Rankings
NCAA Division II football rankings